Acrisure Stadium, formerly known as Heinz Field, is a football stadium located in the North Shore neighborhood of Pittsburgh, Pennsylvania, United States. It primarily serves as the home of the Pittsburgh Steelers of the National Football League (NFL) and the Pittsburgh Panthers of the NCAA Football in the Atlantic Coast Conference (ACC). The stadium opened in 2001 as Heinz Field, following the controlled implosion of the teams' previous home, Three Rivers Stadium. In 2021, the H. J. Heinz Company declined to renew the stadium's naming rights. The City of Pittsburgh green-lit Acrisure's bid to purchase the rights in 2022.

Funded in conjunction with PNC Park and the David L. Lawrence Convention Center, the $281 million (equivalent to $ million in ) stadium stands along the Ohio River, on the North Side of Pittsburgh in the North Shore neighborhood. The stadium was designed with the city of Pittsburgh's history of steel production in mind, which led to the inclusion of 12,000 tons of steel into construction. Ground for the stadium was broken in June 1999, and the first football game was hosted in September 2001. The stadium's natural-grass surface has been criticized throughout its history, but Steelers owners have kept the grass after lobbying from players and coaches. The 68,400-seat stadium has sold out for most Steelers home games, a streak that dates to 1972. A collection of Steelers and Panthers memorabilia is in the Great Hall.

The stadium has hosted two outdoor hockey games: the 2011 NHL Winter Classic between the Pittsburgh Penguins and Washington Capitals, and the 2017 NHL Stadium Series game between the Penguins and Philadelphia Flyers. The venue has also hosted numerous concerts; on May 18, 2019, a Garth Brooks performance was attended by 75,000 people, the highest-ticketed show in Pittsburgh history.

History

Planning and funding
The Pittsburgh Steelers and the Pittsburgh Pirates shared Three Rivers Stadium from 1970 to 2000. After discussions over the Pirates building a full-time baseball park, a proposal was made to renovate Three Rivers Stadium into a full-time football facility. Although the Steelers' owners disliked the idea, the proposal was used as a "fallback position" that would be used if discussions for a new stadium failed. The Steelers' owners said failing to build a new stadium would hurt the franchise's chances of signing players who might sign with other teams, such as the other three in the Steelers division, who had all recently built new football-only stadiums. In June 2001, the H. J. Heinz Company purchased the naming rights to the stadium. Per the deal, Heinz would pay the Steelers a total of $57 million through 2021, the "57" being an intentional reference to Heinz 57. Despite Heinz later announcing its acquisition of Kraft Foods Group to form Kraft Heinz Company in 2015, the stadium's name was retained.

Originally, a sales tax increase was proposed to fund three projects:  Heinz Field, PNC Park, and an expansion of the David L. Lawrence Convention Center. After the rejection of this proposal in a 1997 referendum known as the "Regional Renaissance Initiative", the city developed the alternate funding proposal Plan B. Similarly controversial, the proposal was labeled Scam B by opponents. The Steelers' pledge toward the new stadium was criticized for being too little, even after it was raised from $50 million to $76.5 million. Other local government members criticized the $281 million of public money allocated for Plan B. One member of the Allegheny Regional Asset District board called the use of tax dollars "corporate welfare". The plan, totaling $809 million, was approved by the Allegheny Regional Asset District board on July 9, 1998, with $233 million allotted for Heinz Field. Shortly after Plan B was approved, the Steelers made a deal with Pittsburgh city officials to stay in the city until at least 2031. The total cost of Heinz Field was $281 million.

Design and construction

HOK Sport designed the stadium. HOK Sport's project manager for the project, Melinda Lehman, said that the Rooney family asked for the stadium's design to "acknowledge the history of Pittsburgh and also bring in an element of looking forward, this is where Pittsburgh is going." In order to accomplish this, HOK Sport used steel structurally and externally. The stone used in Acrisure Stadium's design is artificial, in order to decrease cost. Of the glass used in the stadium's design, Lehman said, "The glass is a more modern building element, which ties into a lot of the buildings in [Downtown] Pittsburgh and gives great views of the surrounding areas." The Steelers and Panthers have their own locker rooms, which differ in size based on the number of players each team is permitted to dress for each game. The visitor facilities are modeled after the home locker rooms' design. As with its predecessor, Acrisure Stadium's culinary service provider is Aramark; over 400 eateries are located throughout the stadium. A bronze statue of Steelers founder Art Rooney, similar to those located outside PNC Park, was moved  from its previous position outside Three Rivers Stadium. In addition, a statue of a Pitt Panther over a paved depiction of Pitt's Cathedral of Learning was placed outside Gate A. Upon opening in 2001, Heinz Field's  Sony JumboTron was the largest scoreboard in the NFL. In 2007, ESPN named the "tipping" of the oversized Heinz ketchup bottles atop the scoreboard one of the top ten touchdown celebrations in the NFL.

Ground was broken for Heinz Field on June 18, 1999, at a ceremony co-hosted by the Steelers and the University of Pittsburgh. The stadium was constructed by Hunt Construction Group and Mascaro Corporation. The two companies directed 1,400 workers over two years, in which there were no construction accidents or lawsuits. The stadium is inspected yearly, along with PNC Park, by Chronicle Consulting, LLC, for structural defects and maintenance.

Opening

The first event held at Heinz Field was a concert hosted by 'N Sync on August 18, 2001. Coincidentally, they were also the last band to perform at the Steelers' previous home, Three Rivers Stadium. Before the Steelers' regular season, the team played a pre-season game against the Detroit Lions on August 25, 2001. Pittsburgh won the stadium's unofficial opening game 20–7, before 57,829 spectators. The first official football game played in the stadium was between the Pittsburgh Panthers and East Tennessee State, on September 1. The Panthers won the game 31–0, with quarterback David Priestley scoring the first touchdown on an 85-yard run. The Steelers were scheduled to open the regular season play at Heinz Field on September 16 against the Cleveland Browns; however, due to the September 11 attacks, all NFL games of the week were postponed, thus moving the stadium's premiere to October 7, against the Cincinnati Bengals. Prior to the game, a speech from US President George W. Bush, ordering attacks on Taliban-controlled Afghanistan, was shown live on the stadium's JumboTron. The speech was met with much applause and support from the spectators in attendance. Pittsburgh defeated the Bengals, 16–7. Steelers kicker Kris Brown scored the first NFL points in the stadium on a 26-yard field goal, and quarterback Kordell Stewart scored the first touchdown on an eight-yard run.

That same year, two light-emitting diode (LED) video displays from Daktronics were installed at the field.

In 2007, writer Bill Evans named Heinz Field the second best stadium in the NFL, behind Lambeau Field, in an article for ESPN.com. Although both stadiums received a score of 54 out of 70, Sports Illustrated named Heinz Field the second best stadium in the NFL, also behind Lambeau Field.

Future

While the Steelers continue to make capital improvements to Acrisure Stadium as well as expand seating, the future of the Pitt Panthers at the stadium has been more murky. Since the Panthers moved to the stadium, attendance for games has been varied, ranging from an average high of 59,197 people per game for the 2003 season to a low of 33,315 in 2007. Most recently, Pitt averaged 41,696 in home attendance during the 2018 season. It has been argued that Pitt's low attendance numbers are attributed to Acrisure Stadium being a distance from the Pitt campus in Oakland, with games being largely attended by alumni as well as fans of the opposing teams. Many of Pitt's students who live on or near campus either do not own a car or chose not to bring their car from home, leaving them to rely on the Port Authority of Allegheny County or vehicle for hire companies.

While there has been talk of extending the Pittsburgh Light Rail to Oakland, significant costs were cited during construction of the North Shore Connector, which terminates at Acrisure Stadium. Another solution has mentioned moving the games back on campus with a purpose-built stadium, which has gained support from Pitt's administration.

In January 2021, just as the Heinz naming rights deal was set to expire, it was announced that Kraft-Heinz decided to renew the naming rights for just one more year, ensuring the name would remain through at least the end of 2021. As the naming rights were allowed to expire in 2022, the future name of the stadium was uncertain. However, Steelers president Art Rooney II has said he was "optimistic" about agreeing to another extension with Kraft-Heinz.

However, on July 10, 2022, it was reported that Heinz would not sign a new deal with the Steelers, ending their 21-year business arrangement. After unsuccessfully trying to find another local company to purchase the naming rights, the naming rights were bought by Michigan-based insurance company Acrisure in a deal initially reported on July 11, 2022; Steelers minority owner Thomas Tull also has an ownership stake in Acrisure. The decision to rename the stadium has received overwhelmingly fierce opposition by Steelers fans.

Kraft-Heinz did not remain outside of Steelers culture for much longer after giving up naming rights to the stadium itself, though; the company renegotiated with the Steelers to instead be the naming sponsor for Gate C, the closest gate to Allegheny Light Rail station.

Notable events
In addition to football games, Acrisure Stadium has hosted other various activities.

Football
On August 4, 2012, Heinz Field hosted the Women's Football Alliance's National Championship Game, becoming the first NFL stadium to host a title game for any women's football league.

The quickest score in NFL history occurred on September 8, 2013, in the Steelers season opener against the Tennessee Titans, when the Steelers scored a safety on the opening kickoff three seconds into the game. Darius Reynaud of the Titans fielded the kickoff and took a short step backwards (into the south end zone) for what was ruled to be a safety, not a touchback, because the ball was not in the end zone when it was fielded. The Steelers, however, lost the game 16–9, which was also their first home opener loss since the stadium opened.

The record for longest NFL field goal at Acrisure Stadium (regular season or preseason) is 59 yards and was kicked by Steelers kicker Chris Boswell on October 2, 2022.  In collegiate play, University of Pittsburgh kicker Alex Kessman kicked a 55-yard field goal against the Syracuse Orange on October 6, 2018.

On October 7, 2018, the Steelers won their 100th regular season game at Heinz Field with a record of 100–38–1 at that point.

College Football

On September 1, 2022, the Backyard Brawl between the University of Pittsburgh and West Virginia University met after an 11-year break of the rivalry, due to conference realignment. With an attendance of 70,622 fans, a new record was set for the largest sporting event in the history of Pittsburgh. With the previous record being held by Penn State versus Pitt in 2016 with 69,983 in attendance.

Concerts
Since its opening in 2001, bands and artists including 'N Sync, Beyoncé, Taylor Swift, Kenny Chesney, and LeAnn Rimes have performed at the stadium. In addition, hometown bands The Clarks and the Povertyneck Hillbillies have played multiple shows at the stadium.

Soccer
On July 27, 2014, Heinz Field hosted a soccer match between A.C. Milan and Manchester City which was part of the 2014 International Champions Cup and Manchester City won the match 5–1.

Heinz Field hosted a women's international exhibition match between the United States and Costa Rica on August 16, 2015. It ended in an 8–0 victory for the United States, in their first match since winning the 2015 FIFA Women's World Cup, and set a new attendance record for a standalone women's friendly in the U.S. with 44,028 spectators.

NHL Winter Classic

On May 28, 2010, National Hockey League commissioner Gary Bettman announced that Heinz Field would be the host of the 2011 NHL Winter Classic. The game was played January 1, 2011, between the Pittsburgh Penguins and Washington Capitals. Pittsburgh native Jackie Evancho sang the Star Spangled Banner before local sports legends Franco Harris, Jerome Bettis and Mario Lemieux dropped the ceremonial puck. The Capitals won, 3–1. The game was the highest rated NHL contest since 1996 and the highest rated regular season game since 1975. It was also the first night Classic and the first to use "CableCam" technology.

In film & TV
The 2011 American Idol Auditions chose Pittsburgh of one of six cities and scheduled signups at Heinz Field on July 12–13 and auditions on July 15, 2011.

Heinz Field served as the home field of the Gotham Rogues in the 2012 film The Dark Knight Rises. An estimated 15,000 unpaid extras filled the stadium during shooting on August 6, 2011.

During Episode 4 of The Bachelorette (season 12), eleven contestants competed in a five on five football game. In addition, they met with football players from the Steelers, including Ben Roethlisberger, Hines Ward, and Brett Keisel.

Other events
In 2002, the Pittsburgh Marathon concluded at Heinz Field; the course was altered from past years to allow competitors to cross the finish line on the field.
 
In 2005, the Pittsburgh Wine Festival was held at Heinz Field, over 2,000 people attended.

In 2021, Pittsburgh CLO presented a production of The Wizard of Oz from July 8 to 10 on the field.

Features

Playing surface
In June 2001, Kentucky Bluegrass was laid on the field, at half the height of most NFL field's  grass. The field is heated from below, using a mixture of antifreeze and hot water, to keep the field at around 62 °F (17 °C) in order to keep the grass growing year-round. The field was re-surfaced multiple times, until the synthetic-enhanced Desso GrassMaster was installed in 2003. Debate continued over the surface after players began slipping during game play. Despite this players and coaches of Pitt, the Steelers, and their opponents supported keeping the current turf.

On Friday, November 23, 2007, Heinz Field hosted four WPIAL championship football games which were followed the day after with a game between Pitt and South Florida. After discussion with the NFL, the Steelers owners decided to re-surface the field for their nationally televised game against the Miami Dolphins. A layer of sod was laid on the  GrassMaster surface.  1½ inches of rain fell after the new sod had been laid, which did not allow the tarp to be removed from the field until 70 minutes before the game began. The field conditions were so bad that a punt by Dolphins punter Brandon Fields stuck to the turf without bouncing. The Steelers won the game 3–0, with a field goal by Jeff Reed with 17 seconds remaining; it was the NFL's first 3–0 game since 1993 and the longest two teams went without scoring since the New York Giants and Detroit Lions played to a scoreless tie on November 11, 1943. Scott Brown, of the Pittsburgh Tribune-Review, called the field a "veritable mud pit". Gene Upshaw, head of the National Football League Players' Association, said a 2006 survey of NFL players ranked Heinz Field as the second-worst field in the league. Steelers receiver Hines Ward called the playing conditions "horrendous" after the game. However, the following day Ward and other Pittsburgh players lobbied to keep the natural surface, saying, "I think everybody wants to keep the grass." Since that season, the Steelers have played their game on the weekend after Thanksgiving on the road at the team's request.

Debate continued over the field later in the season when Jacksonville running back Fred Taylor called the field "a lawsuit pending". Pittsburgh's owners said the decision was up to the players, who once again defended the natural surface. In February 2008, the Steelers announced that they would keep the Desso GrassMaster surface. During the 2008 season, quarterback Ben Roethlisberger received a concussion from a hit at Heinz Field. He later said, "I'm glad we weren't on FieldTurf. That grass — you know, the soft Heinz Field — might've helped a little bit." After the 2008 season, a poll of 1,565 NFL players rated the surface at Heinz Field as the worst of the 18 natural surfaces in the League.

The DDGrassmaster surface was removed in January 2009 and replaced with the old sod placed on top of the DDGrassmaster surface for the AFC Championship later that month.

Field design

When the outdoor sports venue opened in 2001, both end zones were painted athletic gold during Steelers home games (this also happened for the final five seasons at Three Rivers Stadium), with “PITTSBURGH” on the North side and “Steelers” on the South side; both words were painted black with white outlines. Either "Steelers" or "Panthers" was painted in the end zone, depending on the game, during the first three years.

For the 2002 Steelers regular season, the area covered by gold paint was reduced to just around the words. The design for the 2002 Wild Card matchup replaced the white letter outlines with athletic gold paint and removed it everywhere else.

In 2003, the Steelers played the Philadelphia Eagles in a preseason game with plain diagonal white lines in the South end zone, which were common in NFL end zones until the 1960s. Although the Steelers lost the game 21–16, team president Dan Rooney liked the look of the South end zone being "plain", and decided to bring it back the next year. The 2003 season was the last year to date which contained “PITTSBURGH” and “Steelers” in black words with athletic gold outlines in both end zones.

Starting in 2004, the wordmark designs were flipped in paint color, “PITTSBURGH” in the North and “Steelers” in the South were now athletic gold with the former having either dark blue outlines for Pitt or black for the Steelers. The diagonal white lines in the South end zone during the college portion of the season began in this year too, with “Steelers” being added after Pitt has played their final home game of the year.

In the aforementioned Dolphins-Steelers Monday Night Football match of 2007, the surface conditions had become so deteriorated from the rain and gameplay itself that the field grid of hash marks, yard lines, mid-field logo, and wordmarks in both end zones were barely visible throughout the game. Sideline hash marks (painted orange) and yard lines were re-painted at halftime.

From 2001 through 2010, there was typically no midfield logo when both Pitt and the Steelers were in season; the Steelers had their logo painted on the sidelines when Pitt's football season was ongoing and transferred it to midfield after Pitt's football season ended (except for the first two seasons when it was only added for the postseason).

As of the 2011 season, Pitt and the Steelers in cooperation have their respective logos at midfield for their own homes games, being interchanged frequently.

Being a member of the American Football Conference (AFC), the grounds crew of Acrisure Stadium has painted the conference logo in both end zones for every Pittsburgh Steelers postseason home game to date.

Seating and tickets
As of 2018, the Pittsburgh Steelers have sold out every home game since the 1972 season. Entering the 2008 season, the Steelers average ticket price of $69.47 was the 15th highest out of the NFL's 32 teams. The majority of the 65,050 seats are colored "Steeler gold," though club seats are dark gray. Acrisure Stadium features 1,500 seats in 129 luxury boxes, with prices ranging from $64,000 to $135,000 depending on location and size. These boxes were predicted to increase the Steelers' profits from $10 to $11 million per season over those at Three Rivers Stadium. The stadium also features 6,600 club seats that include a restaurant and an indoor bar, at prices up to $2,000 per person. For the 2010 season, season ticket prices for Panthers games range from a maximum of $295 per club seat with required donations per seat between $250 and $500 depending on location, to as low as $87 per seat with no required donation for upper end zone sections. Individual game ticket prices ranged from $30 to $65 depending on the seat location and the opponent.

Great Hall

The Hall includes a timeline of the Steelers franchise's major events, an oversized Steelers helmet hangs from the ceiling beside a video screen that shows entertainment for fans throughout game days. The Great Hall also features the actual lockers of several former Steelers, including Hall of Fame members Franco Harris, Joe Greene, and Bill Dudley.

Six large Super Bowl trophies-shaped display columns were erected and contain artifacts from each championship the Steelers have won including replica trophies. Two display columns are dedicated to the University of Pittsburgh and contain memorabilia from the Panthers' teams. The floor is painted to resemble the post-baseball season football field at Three Rivers Stadium, with the word "Steelers" painted in black over a gold background. University of Pittsburgh players are featured on two large murals within the Hall. Eight additional tile murals created by local high schools represent western Pennsylvania football history. In 2007, the Great Hall was named the best concourse at an NFL stadium by writer Bill Evans, in an article for ESPN.com.

Seating expansion
The Steelers notified the Pittsburgh Stadium Authority in December 2010 of their intention to add up to 4,000 seats to the lower southern end of the stadium. The plan would increase seating up to 69,050 as soon as the 2012 NFL season. Seating was added in that section for the 2011 NHL Winter Classic, which had an attendance of 68,111. The temporary seating was left in place for the 2010–11 NFL playoffs, with the AFC Championship game on January 23 having a record attendance of 66,662.

On April 12, 2012, the Steelers confirmed they would seek approval from the NFL to expand seating by 3,000. On May 19, 2014, after more than two years, the Steelers and the SEA came to an agreement to add about 3,000 seats to the venue. After contractors surveyed the complex the final number of 2,390 added seats with five additional suites including more parking, restrooms and concessions was determined in December 2014 to increase capacity to a total of 68,400. The seating was put in place by the summer of 2015.

On September 10, 2016, the then largest crowd of 69,983 to ever see a sporting event in Pittsburgh watched the Pitt Panthers defeat the Penn State Nittany Lions, 42–39 as they renewed their rivalry in football.

On September 1, 2022, a crowd of 70,622 fans broke the record attendance for a sporting event in Pittsburgh again, as No. 17 Pitt defeated the West Virginia Mountaineers 38–31 in the first Backyard Brawl since 2011.

Transportation access
Acrisure Stadium is located at Exit 1B of Interstate 279 within a mile of direct access to both Interstate 376 and Interstate 579. The stadium also has dedicated elevated walkway access to the Allegheny Station of the Light Rail/Subway system. On Steelers and Pitt Panthers game days, access is also provided from Station Square parking facilities via the Gateway Clipper Fleet.

See also

 List of NCAA Division I FBS football stadiums

References

Further reading

External links

 

Music venues completed in 2001
Sports venues completed in 2001
Pittsburgh Steelers stadiums
National Football League venues
Pittsburgh Panthers football venues
College football venues
Ice hockey venues in Pennsylvania
Outdoor ice hockey venues in the United States
Sports venues in Pittsburgh
Music venues in Pittsburgh
American football venues in Pennsylvania
2001 establishments in Pennsylvania
Soccer venues in Pennsylvania